Erica spiculifolia, commonly known as spike heath or Balkan heath, is a species of plant native to southeastern Europe and northern Asia Minor. It is a dwarf evergreen shrub and heath-like plant to 10 in high. Leaves are dark green. The flowers are rose-pink and bell-shaped, appearing in terminal clusters in early summer.

It inhabits sub-alpine areas with acid soils up to 2,800 meters elevation in the mountains of southeastern Europe (Romania, Bulgaria, Bosnia and Herzegovina, Serbia, Montenegro, North Macedonia, Albania, and Greece) and northern Turkey.

Cultivation
The plant prefers sandy peat with lime-free. Propagate from seed, cuttings or division. It is suitable for rock gardens and borders.

References

 Botanica  Sistematica

spiculifolia
Flora of the Carpathians
Flora of Southeastern Europe
Flora of Turkey
Alpine flora